WLMP-LP is a Contemporary Christian formatted broadcast radio station licensed to and serving Fredericksburg, Virginia.  WLMP-LP is owned and operated by Calvary Chapel of Fredericksburg.

Translator
In addition to the main station, WLMP-LP is relayed by an FM translator to widen its broadcast area.

References

External links
 The Lamp 102.7 Online
 

2005 establishments in Virginia
Contemporary Christian radio stations in the United States
Radio stations established in 2005
LMP-LP
LMP-LP
Fredericksburg, Virginia